Jan Fortelný (born 19 January 1999) is a Czech footballer who plays as a midfielder for Sigma Olomouc on loan from Sparta Prague.

Club career

Youth level

On youth level he played for AC Sparta Prague. He played in 4 2016-17 UEFA Youth League matches against OFK Titograd and Altinordu FK scoring 2 goals, also he played in 3 2017-18 UEFA Youth League matches against F91 Dudelange and RB Salzburg.

AC Sparta Prague
He made his debut for the first team on 20 September 2020 in the Czech First League match against FC Fastav Zlín. 

Since then he played in 1 league match and in 1 Czech Cup match without scoring a goal (actual to 21 January 2021). He also played in 3 matches (scoring 3 goals) for reserve team in Bohemian Football League.

FC Sellier and Bellot Vlašim (loan)
On 17 August 2018 he was loaned to FC Sellier & Bellot Vlašim in Czech National Football League. In one year long loan he played in 21 league matches (scoring 2 goals) and in 2 Czech Cup matches (scoring 1 goal).

FC Vysočina Jihlava (loan)
On 11 July 2019 he was loaned to FC Vysočina Jihlava also in Czech National Football League. In one year long loan he played in 28 league matches scoring 1 goal, also he played in 1 Czech Cup match without scoring a goal.

FK Teplice (loan)
On 5 October 2020 he was loaned to FK Teplice in Czech First League. In 3 months long loan he played in 6 league matches without scoring a goal.

On 8 February 2021 he was loaned to FK Teplice again.

On 12 August 2021 he was loaned to FK Teplice once again.

SK Sigma Olomouc (loan)
On 2 January 2023 he was loaned to SK Sigma Olomouc for half a season.

International career
He had played international football at under-16, 17, 18, 19 and 20 level for Czech Republic U16, Czech Republic U17, Czech Republic U18, Czech Republic U19 and Czech Republic U20. He played in 35 matches scoring 6 goals.

References

External links
 https://repre.fotbal.cz/hrac/hraci/4998
 

1999 births
Living people
Czech footballers
Czech Republic under-21 international footballers
Czech Republic youth international footballers
Association football midfielders
Czech First League players
AC Sparta Prague players
FC Sellier & Bellot Vlašim players
FC Vysočina Jihlava players
FK Teplice players
Czech National Football League players
Bohemian Football League players
Footballers from Prague
SK Sigma Olomouc players